Rami M. Shapiro (26 April 1951), commonly called "Rabbi Rami", is an author, teacher, and speaker on the subjects of liberal Judaism and contemporary spirituality.

Early life and education 

Shapiro was born in Springfield, Massachusetts and raised in a modern Orthodox Jewish household. Introduced to the study of world religion in high school, he began a serious study and practice of Zen Buddhism at the age of sixteen.

Shapiro entered the University of Massachusetts Amherst in 1969, majoring in philosophy. There, he met Teresina Havens, a retired professor of world religion from Smith College who took him on as a private student studying both the Bhagavad Gita and Goddess-based spirituality. His work with Havens culminated in a private conference exploring the archetypal Divine Feminine in Hinduism and Judaism.

As part of a study abroad program, Shapiro attended the University of Tel Aviv, where he focused on Jewish philosophy, especially the work of Martin Buber. While in Israel, he studied Chabad Hasidism and lived for a short time at Kfar Chabad, a Chabad Lubavitch Hasidic community. He then enrolled full-time at Smith College (one of only eight men allowed to do so at the time), where he majored in Buddhist Studies with Professor Taitetsu Unno. Shapiro managed Smith's zendo and sat sesshin with Joshu Sasaki Roshi of Mount Baldy Zen Center. His philosophy degree was conferred by the University of Massachusetts in 1973.

Upon graduation, Shapiro married Deborah Flanigan and the two moved to Hamilton, Ontario where he earned his M.A. in Religious Studies at McMaster University with a concentration in contemporary Jewish philosophy, especially the work of Rabbi Mordecai Kaplan.

Shapiro entered the Hebrew Union College–Jewish Institute of Religion in 1976 and spent his first year of study in Jerusalem, where he studied privately with Rabbi Kaplan, who was then 99 years old, and with Rabbi Sherwin Wine and the Society for Humanistic Judaism. After his year in Jerusalem, Shapiro continued his studies under the tutelage of Ellis Rivkin, Eugene Mihaly, Alvin Reines, and Rabbi Sherwin Wine, seeking to blend his love of Judaism with his passion for Zen Buddhism, Taoism, and Advaita Vedanta (non-dual Hinduism). In 1979 he was appointed as a chaplain in the United States Air Force, where he served as the full-time rabbi at Wright-Patterson AFB. Shapiro completed his rabbinic studies in 1981.

Career and work 
Upon graduation, Shapiro moved to Miami and created Temple Beth Or, a synagogue and think tank where he experimented with new forms of Jewish liturgy and practice, combining his experiences with Judaism, Buddhism, and Hinduism. He continued his Zen practice with the aid of Gesshin Roshi's International Zen Institute of Miami. In 1985 Shapiro completed a Ph.D. in Contemporary Jewish Studies from Union Graduate School using his work with the temple as the basis for his dissertation. During his 20 years at Temple Beth Or, Shapiro studied with Rabbi Zalman Shachter-Shalomi, the founder of Jewish Renewal, a neo-Hasidic movement. In 2000 Shachter-Shalomi gave him the title of Rebbe (spiritual master).

In 1984 Shapiro was invited to become a founding member of the Snowmass Group, an annual gathering of contemplatives from various religions held at St. Benedict's Monastery in Snowmass, Colorado, under the auspices of Father Thomas Keating. Through Keating, Shapiro met Ed Bastian, the founder of the Spiritual Paths Institute, and became part of the institute's faculty. Also on the institute's faculty was Swami Atmarupananda, who became Shapiro's primary Hindu teacher. After a decade of study, Shapiro was initiated into the Ramakrishna Order of Vedanta Hinduism under Atmarupananda's teacher, Swami Swahananda. Shapiro lectures on the parallels between Judaism and Hinduism at various Vedanta centers in India and the United States.

In 2002 Shapiro was invited to deliver the Huston Smith Lecture at the California Institute of Integral Studies. He called this lecture, delivered with Smith sitting in the front row, "one of the highlights of my career."

In 2012 Shapiro teamed up with Reverend Tim Miner and the Order of Universal Interfaith to co-found the annual Big I Conference on Inclusive Theology, Spirituality, and Consciousness.

In 2016, after leaving the university, Shapiro teamed up with Reverend Claire Goodman and Frank Levy to create the One River Foundation. One River promotes the study of Perennial Wisdom, the mystic heart found at the core of all religions. The foundation sponsors five projects: The One River Wisdom School, a retreat-based program for the study of sacred texts Eastern and Western; The Order of the Holy Rascal, honoring people who strive to free their respective religions from politics, power, and parochialism; Cup of Wisdom, a book club to study The World Wisdom Bible, an anthology of Perennial Wisdom texts and teachings of many world religions; The Grand Lodge of All Beings, to train people to live as a blessing to all the families of the Earth (Genesis 12:3); and Conversations on the Edge, a podcast that explores cutting-edge ideas in spirituality and cultural transformation.

In addition to writing books and teaching, Shapiro is a Contributing Editor at Spirituality and Health magazine, for which he writes "Roadside Assistance for the Spiritual Traveler", a spiritual Q&A column, and "Roadside Musings", a blog on the magazine's website. He also hosts the magazine's podcast, "Essential Conversations with Rabbi Rami".

In 2020, Shapiro received the Huston Smith Award for Interfaith Education and Service from the Board of Directors of the Order of Universal Interfaith.

He served for ten years as Adjunct Professor of Religion at Middle Tennessee State University.

Honors 

 "Huston Smith Award for Interfaith Education and Service" (2020)
Spirituality & Practice Award for Best Spiritual Nonfiction (2001, 2002, 2005, 2007, 2009, 2010)
 Best Buddhist Writing (essay) (2009)
 Tennessee Intellectual Freedom Award (2006)
 Reb Zalman Shachter-Shalomi Legacy Award (2002)
 Best Jewish Writing (essay) (2001, 2002)
 Templeton Foundation Prize in Expanding Humanity's Vision of God (2000)
 Best Nonfiction Essay, Florida Newspaper Association (1993, 1994)
 Moment Magazine Community Service Award (1989)
 Bettan Memorial Prize for Creativity in the Liturgical Arts (1981)

Works 
Open Hands, a Jewish guide to dying, death & bereavement, Medic Publishing (1990)
Open Hearts, helping friends through mourning, Medic Publishing (1991)
The Wisdom of the Jewish Sages, Bell Tower/Random House (1995)
Minyan, Bell Tower/Random House (1997)
The Way of Solomon, HarperSanFrancisco (2000)
The Wisdom of Solomon, Bell Tower/Random House	(2001)
Hasidic Tales, Annotated and Explained, Skylight Paths  (2003)
The Prophets, Annotated and Explained, Skylight Paths (2004)
Open Secrets, Monkfish (2004)
Breaking Bread Together, Paraclete Press (2005) 
The Divine Feminine, Annotated and Explained, Skylight Paths (2005) 
Ethics of the Jewish Sages, Annotated and Explained, Skylight Paths (2006)
The Sacred Art of Lovingkindness, Skylight Paths (2006)
Recovery, 12 Steps as Spiritual Practice, Skylight Paths (2009)
The Angelic Way, Bluebridge (2009)
Ecclesiastes, Annotated and Explained, Skylight Paths (2010)
Tanya, Annotated and Explained, Skylight Paths (2010)
Love of Eternal Wisdom, Wisdom House Books (2011)
Proverbs, Annotated and Explained, Skylight Paths (2011)
Rabbi Rami Guide to God, Spirituality & Health (2011)
Rabbi Rami Guide to Forgiveness, Spirituality & Health  (2011)
Rabbi Rami Guide to Parenting, Spirituality & Health (2011)
Rabbi Rami Guide to Psalm 23, Spirituality & Health (2011)
The Sacred Art of Writing, Skylight Paths (2012)
Mount & Mountain, Volume 1, Smyth & Helwys (2012), with Rev. Dr. Mike Smith
Amazing Chesed, Jewish Lights Publishing (2012)
Mount & Mountain, Volume 2, Smyth & Helwys  (2013)
Perennial Wisdom for the Spiritually Independent (2013)
Mount & Mountain, Volume 3, Smyth & Helwys (2014)
Let us Break Bread Together, with Rev. Dr. Mike Smith, Paraclete Press.
The Golden Rule & the World's Religions, Skylight Paths (2015)
Accidental Grace:Poetry, Prayers and Psalms. 2015
The World Wisdom Bible, Tuner Publishing (2017)
Holy Rascals, Sounds True Publishing (2017)
The Tao of Solomon: Unlocking the Perennial Wisdom of Ecclesiastes, Ben Yehudah Press (2018)
Surrendered: Shattering the Illusion of Control and Falling Grace with Twelve-Step Spirituality, Skylight Paths (2019)
The Gospel of Sophia, One River Books (forthcoming)

In addition to these books, Shapiro has contributed chapters to over three dozen anthologies.

References

External links 

 Personal Website
 One River Foundation
 Holy Rascals
 Order of Universal Interfaith
 BIG I Conference on Inclusive Theology, Spirituality and Consciousness
 Our Jewish Community
 Spirituality and Practice

1951 births
Living people
American rabbis
McMaster University alumni
Middle Tennessee State University faculty
University of Massachusetts Amherst alumni
United States Air Force officers
United States Air Force chaplains
21st-century American Jews